The Niterói-class frigates are a class of frigates of the Brazilian Navy.

History 
The Niterói class were designed and built by the British shipyard Vosper Thornycroft (VT) in the 1970s. These frigates were designated the Mk 10 by Vosper Thornycroft and are the largest of a series of ships built by that shipyard for both foreign buyers and the Royal Navy.

All of them were extensively modernized between 1996 and 2005 under the 'ModFrag' program. The projected completion was 2001, but due to lack of funds and sea trials to verify the new software, the entire program had been slipped to 2005.

A total of six ships were built. Two of the anti submarine (ASW) and both of the general purpose (GP) version were built in England. The remaining two ASW ships were built at the Arsenal da Marinha in Rio de Janeiro with assistance from VT. The ASW ships had an Ikara missile launcher in Y position aft of the flight deck. This was removed as part of the modernisation programme. The GP ships had a second  gun in "Y" position. A seventh ship was built as the navy's main training unit. The ship is identical to the other ships of the class, but is not fitted with weapons or sensors.

Three of the currently actives will be replaced by the new  frigates, the three survivors will be revitalized and will have their combat systems updated to the standard SICONTA MkII Mod. 1, developed by the Brazilian company Akaer Engenharia.

Ships

Gallery

See also
 List of naval ship classes in service

References

Citations

Sources
 Marinha do Brasil (Brazilian Navy)
 Conway's All the World's Fighting Ships 1947–1995
 Cicalesi, J.C. e Del Gaizo, Cesar: La Marina brasiliana oggi, RiD magazine, Chiavari, June 2006, pag. 50–55
Saunders, Stephen. Jane's Fighting Ships 2002–2003. Coulsdon, UK: Jane's Information Group, 2002. .

External links
 

 
Frigate classes
Frigates of the Brazilian Navy